Vimala Raman is an Australian actress and former model who has worked in Indian cinema. She appears in Malayalam, Telugu and Tamil language films. Born and brought up in Australia, she made her debut in 2006 with the Tamil film Poi. An established Bharatanatyam dancer and a graduate in B.Sc Information Systems from the University of New South Wales, Sydney, Raman had also won the title of Miss India Australia in 2004

Career 
Raman made her acting debut in 2006 with Poi, a Tamil film directed by Kailasam Balachander. Her first Malayalam film was Time with Suresh Gopi. She paired with Ajmal Ameer in Pranayakalam in 2007 and with Jayaram in Sooryan. In the same year, she also appeared with Mammooty in Nasrani and with Dileep in Romeoo. She appeared in College Kumaran with Mohanlal and in Calcutta News with Dileep in 2008. Vimala Raman attended the Natanalaya Dance Academy based in Sydney, Australia. She studied dance under the tutelage of Jayalakshmi Kandiah.

In February 2016, she acted in the Malayalam film Oppam, along with actor Mohanlal.

Filmography 
As Actress

Web series

References

External links 

 
 
 

Living people
Actresses from Sydney
Australian film actresses
People educated at MLC School
University of New South Wales alumni
Australian people of Tamil descent
Australian people of Indian descent
Australian actresses of Indian descent
Australian expatriate actresses in India
Actresses in Tamil cinema
Actresses in Telugu cinema
Actresses in Malayalam cinema
Actresses in Kannada cinema
Actresses in Hindi cinema
21st-century Australian actresses
Year of birth missing (living people)